Notoreas simplex is a species of moth in the family Geometridae. It is endemic to New Zealand.

Taxonomy
This species was first described in 1898 by George Hudson using material he collected on Mount Arthur in January. Hudson also discussed and illustrated this species in his 1928 book The Butterflies and Moths of New Zealand. The genus Notoreas was reviewed in 1986 by R. C. Craw and the placement of this species within it was confirmed. In 2010 Brian Patrick, Robert Hoare and Birgit Rhode synonymised Notoreas regilla with N. simplex. Although they retained the species N. simplex this status was regarded by them as tentative. Species within the genus Notoreas are currently regarded as being in need of revision and in particular this species is regarded as needing more taxonomic work. The holotype specimen is held at the Museum of New Zealand Te Papa Tongarewa.

Description
Hudson originally described the species as follows:

However the holotype specimen Hudson used for this description is regarded as diverging from the normal appearance of this species. Also Philpott's specimen used for the first description of Lythria regilla is a distinctive form of N. simplex.

Distribution
N. simplex is endemic to New Zealand. This species is found in the mountains of Nelson, Marlborough and Canterbury and also on the Kaikoura and Canterbury coast as far south as Kaitorete Spit.

Life cycle and behaviour

The female moth lays her eggs within the flower buds of their host plant. When the larvae emerge from their eggs, they eat into the leaves or buds of their host, hiding from predators. Once they are large enough, they emerge to feed from the fresh growth of the plant. N. simplex pupate in a loose cocoon on the ground under their host. N. simplex likely has two generations each year with adults on the wing in the months of late September until April. N. simplex are day-flying moths. They are low but fast flyers and constantly vibrate their wings to enable them to take off rapidly.

Host species
The host plants for the larvae of N. simplex are endemic species of Pimelea including Pimelea prostrata at Kaitorete Spit.

References

Larentiinae
Moths described in 1898
Moths of New Zealand
Endemic fauna of New Zealand
Taxa named by George Hudson
Endemic moths of New Zealand